Alameda Central is a public urban park in downtown Mexico City. Created in 1592, the Alameda Central is the oldest public park in the Americas. It is located in Cuauhtémoc borough, adjacent to the Palacio de Bellas Artes, between Juárez Avenue and Hidalgo Avenue. Alameda Central can be accessed by Metro Bellas Artes.

Description
The Alameda Central park is a green garden with paved paths and decorative fountains and statues, and is frequently the center of civic events. The area used to be an Aztec marketplace. On 11 January 1592, Viceroy Luis de Velasco II ordered the creation of a public green space for the city's residents. The name comes from the Spanish word álamo, which means poplar tree, that were planted here. This park was part of the viceroy's plan to develop what was, at that time, the western edge of the city. It has become a symbol of a traditional Mexican park and many other parks in the country take on the name "Alameda" as well.

Public art

Fountains and statues in the park include:
 Beethoven Monument
 Benito Juárez Hemicycle
 Désespoire
 Fountain of Mercury
 Fountain of Neptune
 Fountain of Venus
 Fountain of Virgin (central fountain)
 Gladiador frigio
 Gladiador romano
 La Primavera
 Las Danaides
 Malgré Tout
 Statue of Alexander von Humboldt

History
The original park was less than half the size of the current one, reaching only from where the Palacio de Bellas Artes is now to the location of the Hemiciclo de Juárez. What is now the western section of the park originally was a plain plaza built during the Inquisition in Mexico and known as El Quemadero or The Burning Place. Here witches and others convicted by the Inquisitors were publicly burned at the stake. By the 1760s, the Inquisition had nearly come to an end, and in 1770, viceroy Marqués de Croix had this plaza torn up to expand the park. The park was expanded again in 1791, when the Count of Revillagigedo built a wooden fence around the park to make it exclusive for the nobility. However, when Mexican Independence was won in 1821, the Alameda was the center of popular celebrations. In 1846, when President Santa Anna rode triumphantly into Mexico City, he ordered the fountains in the park be filled with alcohol.

The five classical fountains are of French design and inspired by Greco-Roman mythology. More statues were added to the park in the 19th century. Gas lamps were installed in 1868, which were replaced by electrical lighting 1892. By the end of the 19th century, the park had become popular with all social classes in Mexico. Much of the current layout of the park, with its starburst pattern of paths around fountains and the central kiosk dates from the late 19th and early 20th centuries.

By the late 19th century, the park included a bandstand and gas (now electric) lamps. On the south side of the park, facing toward the street is the Hemiciclo a Juárez, which is a large white semi-circular monument to Benito Juárez, one of Mexico's most beloved presidents.

The park's statues include Désespoire and Malgré Tout, by Jesús Fructuoso Contreras, and a monument donated by the German community which is dedicated to Beethoven in commemoration of the centenary of his 9th Symphony.

In 2012, the park went through a rehabilitation which began in May and was completed in December. The renewal included replacing the damaged pavement with marble, the improvement of the vegetation (including the planting of new trees), new light posts, and improvement of existing park features (e.g. benches and the fountains). As part of the rehabilitation, the once ubiquitous street vendors are no longer allowed to operate within the park.

Gallery

See also

List of oldest buildings in the Americas

References

External links

 
1592 establishments in New Spain
Colonial Mexico
Gardens in Mexico
History of Mexico City
Parks in Mexico City